Bharatiya Vidya Bhavan's Mehta Vidyalaya, or Bharatiya Vidya Bhavan, New Delhi or BVB Delhi or Bhavans, is a private senior secondary school run by an Indian Educational trust known as the Bharatiya Vidya Bhavan. It is a co-educational school with a student strength of around 2000 and staff strength of about 500. The school is recognized by the Delhi administration and is permanently affiliated to the Central Board of Secondary Education.

It has classes from Nursery To XII and prepares pupils for the All India Senior School Certificate Examination, conducted by CBSE. The school provides instruction in Humanities, Science, Commerce and Fine Arts.

History 
Bhavan's Delhi Kendra is one of the first public schools in Delhi. Dr. Rajendra Prasad, the first President of India, laid its foundation. The school was started in April, 1954. Its management was taken over by the Bharatiya Vidya Bhavan after the Delhi home of the Bhavan was inaugurated by Pandit Jawaharlal Nehru on 18 May 1957.

Campus 

The campus is spread over 4.8 acres. Started with one building, the school now has four buildings in its campus. These are known as -
 Mehta Sadan
 Hathi Sadan
 Usha & Lakshmi Mittal Institute of Management 
 Madhav Prasad Priyamvada Birla Sadan

The school has over 75 classrooms, two canteens, five computer labs, science labs, an open-air auditorium, basketball courts, volleyball courts, table tennis rooms, and football ground. The first netball court among Delhi schools belongs to BVB Delhi. The School offers a wide array of courses in management, which is governed by a separate entity, but the building, known as Usha & Lakshmi Mittal is located in school premises. It also offers some notable language courses and few tour and travels related diplomas. Also they have a very good faculty in animation related courses.

Notable alumni 
 Ashish Vidyarthi
 Dewang Mehta
Ajay Jadeja
Robin Bist
Aruna Roy
Harsh Chhaya
B. V. Nagarathna

References

External links 
 http://www.bvbdelhi.org
 https://www.bvbmehtavidyalaya.org/
 https://web.archive.org/web/20130811092752/http://www.bhavanites.com/
https://www.bhavans.info

1950 establishments in India
Educational institutions established in 1950
High schools and secondary schools in Delhi
Buildings and structures in New Delhi
Schools affiliated with the Bharatiya Vidya Bhavan
Private schools in Delhi